Winduga  is a settlement in the administrative district of Gmina Sulejów, within Piotrków County, Łódź Voivodeship, in central Poland.

References

Villages in Piotrków County